Orient Manufacturing Company-Chadwick-Hoskins No. 3, also known as Alpha-Orient Cotton Mill, is a historic cotton mill located at Charlotte, Mecklenburg County, North Carolina. It was built in 1901–1902, and is a two-story,  Romanesque Revival style brick building.  It incorporates portions of an original mill building built about 1889.  The building has a low, front gable roof with exposed rafters, brick exterior walls, and segmental arched windows.  It features a three-story staircase tower with a castellated parapet, tall, narrow windows, and a round arched entrance.

It was added to the National Register of Historic Places in 2006. The building had been converted into an apartment complex named Alpha Mill Apartments.

References

Cotton mills in the United States
Industrial buildings and structures on the National Register of Historic Places in North Carolina
Romanesque Revival architecture in North Carolina
Industrial buildings completed in 1902
Buildings and structures in Charlotte, North Carolina
National Register of Historic Places in Mecklenburg County, North Carolina